Alain Morissette (born August 26, 1969) is a Canadian former professional ice hockey goaltender.

Prior to turning professional, Morissette played major junior hockey in the Quebec Major Junior Hockey League.

In a 1996 ECHL game while playing for the Louisville RiverFrogs, Morissette became the only goaltender in hockey history ever to surrender a goal to another goaltender. The goal was scored by Nick Vitucci of the Charlotte Checkers.

Awards and honours

References

External links

1969 births
Living people
Canadian ice hockey goaltenders
Fredericton Canadiens players
Ice hockey people from Quebec
Idaho Steelheads (WCHL) players
Knoxville Cherokees players
Louisville RiverFrogs players
Muskegon Lumberjacks players
People from Rimouski
Trois-Rivières Draveurs players
Waco Wizards players
Winston-Salem Thunderbirds players
Montreal Roadrunners players
Pittsburgh Phantoms (RHI) players